Everesting is an activity in which cyclists or runners ascend and descend a given hill multiple times, in order to have cumulatively climbed  (the elevation of Mount Everest).

The first event described as "Everesting" was by George Mallory, grandson of George Mallory, who disappeared on Everest in 1924. The younger Mallory ascended Mount Donna Buang in 1994, having ridden eight "laps" of the 1,069-metre hill. The format and rules were cemented by Andy van Bergen, inspired by the story of Mallory's effort. In the first official group effort, van Bergen organized 65 riders, 40 of whom finished the Everesting attempt.

Everesting
George Mallory's Everesting attempt in 1994 was written up into an article in 2012, which first prompted others to take on this challenge. The widespread growth of GPS technology and social media - particularly Strava and Zwift - has been vital in allowing riders to accurately measure distance, elevation and height gain, while also sharing information about their ride. The writer and cyclist Andy van Bergen has been key to popularizing the idea through the Hells 500 group, which had been created as a social group to allow its members to complete and share cycling challenges. Hells 500 created the Everesting website, which established the parameters of the challenge, and started documenting attempts.

Everesting has grown among both amateur cyclists as a challenging but achievable goal, and among professionals or retired professionals who have sought to break Everesting time records. It rose further in popularity during 2020 when the Covid-19 Pandemic resulted in cancelled races, and lockdowns prevented cycling club rides or travel for cycling challenges. This forced riders to seek new challenges, that could be completed on local roads, or on virtual platforms (sometimes called vEveresting). During 2020, the challenge grew beyond cycling into running.

A number of related challenges have spun-off from the original Everesting challenge. Riders have attempted double, triple or even quadruple Everests.

Parameters
Everesting is a personal challenge, and as such there is no official sanctioning body: the only criterion is that  of climbing is completed in a single ride or run. To be accepted as a ride on the Everesting website, an attempt must, among other things:

 be recorded on Strava or Zwift;
 be timed as one effort, with any breaks for food or rest included in the attempt's elapsed time;
 be completed by going up and down one route of ascent only, avoiding loops;
 be continuous, with athletes cycling or running down the slope as well as up it (eg, they cannot be taken by car down the slope);
 be completed using a bike that does not have a motor.

Everesting recognise different rules for variants of the challenge, some of which incorporate sleeping or longer rest breaks to ensure rider safety.

Fastest known times

Women

Men

Notable Everesting rides

 Jett Stokes is the youngest to complete a Real World Everest. At 10 years old, he Everested Florence Avenue, Sydney, Australia on 13 November 2021
 The first woman to Everest was Sarah Hammond in February 2014, climbing Australia's Mount Buffalo eight times.

 Frank Garcia was the first to "virtually Everest", riding Zwift's Watopia Wall 314 times.
 Pavel Paloncý and Markéta Peggy Marvanová (both Czech) Everested 14x between April 19, 2021 and June 22, 2021 on iconic Alpine passes as a part of their Corona of the Himalayas project referring to both Crown of the Himalaya and Covid-19 Pandemic.
 Gautam Sridhar was the first to have done both a Real World Everest (19 July 2014) and a Virtual Everest on Zwift (10 August 2015).
 Jens Voigt Everested Teufelsberg, Berlin, in January 2017.
 Benny JJ completed an Everesting every month of 2016, for a total of 12 Everestings, including one HRS ride.
 Ben Soja was the first to Everest on a unicycle, riding up Mount Lowe in the San Gabriel Mountains of California ten times over twenty-three hours.

 Manuel Scheidegger was the first to Everest on the rear wheelie (wheelie). The attempt took him over 20 hours, nearly three times as long as the current Everesting record.
 The double Everesting world record is held by Frederik Böna in 23 hours and 26 minutes. The record was set on April 10, 2021 with an average power of 225 watts.
 Jett Stokes, aged 10.5 years, is the youngest known Everester, who completed a virtual Everesting on Zwift's Alp d'Zwift on 8 August 2021, riding  in a time of 15:21:27.
 The steepest Everesting ever (26% slope) has been done by Arend VandenBroucke in Sierra Helada in Benidorm (Spain) at Nov 27th 2021. He only needed 70,5 km to complete the challenge.
 From June 8, 2022 until June 12, 2022 Arend VandenBroucke did a sextuple Everesting on Cresta del Gallo, Murcia (Spain). He rode 1429 km in 108 hours with an elevation of 53454m.
 In March 2017 Charlie Rentoul became the first person to Everest the "Tallest" mountain in the world. This required just two ascents and descents of the 89km long climb of the dormant volcano Mauna Kea in Hawaii. The road is frequently ranked as the hardest climb in the world due to its steep gravel sections and high altitude which peaks at 4,200m.

References

External links
 
 

Cycling events
Cycling records and statistics